Armada is a genus of moths of the family Noctuidae. The genus was described by Staudinger in 1884.

Species
 Armada barrygoateri Fibiger & Ronkay, 2003
 Armada clio Staudinger, 1884
 Armada dentata Staudinger, 1884
 Armada fletcheri Wiltshire, 1961
 Armada funesta Brandt, 1939
 Armada heliothidia Hampson, 1896
 Armada maritima Brandt, 1939
 Armada nilotica A. Bang-Haas 1912
 Armada panaceorum Menetries, 1848
 Armada philbyi Wiltshire, 1979

References

Armadini